This is a list of investments made by Microsoft Corporation.

Since 1994, Microsoft has invested in about 140 companies worldwide, including:

See also
Lists of corporate assets
List of mergers and acquisitions by Microsoft

References

External links
Microsoft – Investment History

Microsoft Corporation
Assets